Edward Robert Butterworth (August 14, 1908 – September 7, 1984) was an American lawyer and politician.

Early life
Butterworth was born on August 14, 1908 in Lynn, Massachusetts. He graduated from Lynn Classical High School in 1925, Dartmouth College in 1930, and Boston College Law School in 1934.

Political career
Butterworth began his political career as a member of the Nahant, Massachusetts school committee. From 1943 to 1947 he represented the 12th Essex District in the Massachusetts House of Representatives. In 1950 he was a candidate for Massachusetts Attorney General. He finished third in the Republican primary behind Frederick Ayer Jr. and George Fingold.

Legal career
Butterworth practiced law for 50 years. He founded the law firm of Butterworth and Palleschi, which was based in Lynn, and also practiced law in Barnstable County, Massachusetts while he was a summer resident of New Seabury, Massachusetts. Butterworth died on September 7, 1984 in Burlington, Massachusetts.

See also
 1943–1944 Massachusetts legislature
 1945–1946 Massachusetts legislature

References

1908 births
1984 deaths
Boston College Law School alumni
Dartmouth College alumni
Republican Party members of the Massachusetts House of Representatives
Massachusetts lawyers
People from Lynn, Massachusetts
People from Mashpee, Massachusetts
People from Nahant, Massachusetts
People from Swampscott, Massachusetts
20th-century American politicians
20th-century American lawyers